United Nations Security Council resolution 558, adopted unanimously on 13 December 1984, after recalling resolutions 418 (1977) and 421 (1977) which imposed a compulsory arms embargo on South Africa and established a committee to monitor it, the council stressed the continuing need for all Member States and international organisations to observe the arms embargo.

The council also called for States and organisations not to receive South African made weapons and military vehicles, and requested the Secretary-General to report back on the implementation of the resolution by no later than 31 December 1985.

See also
 List of United Nations Security Council Resolutions 501 to 600 (1982–1987)
 South Africa under apartheid
 United Nations Security Council Resolution 591

References
Text of the Resolution at undocs.org

External links
 

 0558
1984 in South Africa
 0558
United Nations Security Council sanctions regimes
December 1984 events